Merge with Southern Christian Institute

Bonner-Campbell College was a historically black college located in Edwards, Mississippi.  It began as the Southern Christian Institute run by the Church of Christ in 1882.

It merged with Tougaloo College in 1953 and the campus closed. Bob Moses hosted civil rights leadership training at the campus.

References

Defunct private universities and colleges in Mississippi
Education in Hinds County, Mississippi
1882 establishments in Mississippi